Smaragdina is a genus of short-horned leaf beetles belonging to the family Chrysomelidae, subfamily Cryptocephalinae.

Species 
These species belong to the genus Smaragdina:

Smaragdina aeneoviridis Lopatin, 1975
Smaragdina aethiops Lopatin, 2004
Smaragdina affinis (Illiger, 1794)
Smaragdina algirica (Weise, 1894)
Smaragdina amasina (Pic, 1897)
Smaragdina apiciflava (Chûjô, 1952)
Smaragdina apicipennis (Jacoby, 1908)
Smaragdina apicitarsis (Fairmaire, 1876)
Smaragdina assamensis (Jacoby, 1908)
Smaragdina atriceps (Pic, 1927)
Smaragdina atricollis (Pic, 1922)
Smaragdina atrocincta (Pic, 1932)
Smaragdina atropyga (Pic, 1941)
Smaragdina aurita (Linnaeus, 1767)
Smaragdina bechynei (Cobos, 1956)
Smaragdina bertiae Medvedev, 1992
Smaragdina bezdeki Medvedev, 2010
Smaragdina bicoloriceps (Pic, 1929)
Smaragdina biornata Lefèvre, 1872
Smaragdina bisbipunctata Medvedev, 2010
Smaragdina bohemani (Jacoby, 1908)
Smaragdina boreosinica Gressitt & Kimoto, 1961
Smaragdina bothrionota Tan, 1987
Smaragdina centromaculata Medvedev, 1995
Smaragdina chloris (Lacordaire, 1848)
Smaragdina chrysomeloides (Lacordaire, 1848)
Smaragdina clavareaui (Jacobson, 1906)
Smaragdina clypealis (Medvedev, 1992)
Smaragdina cobosi (Codina, 1963)
Smaragdina cochinchinensis (Lefèvre, 1889)
Smaragdina coerulea (Jacoby, 1892)
Smaragdina collaris (Fabricius, 1781)
Smaragdina compressipennis (Pic, 1927)
Smaragdina concolor (Fabricius, 1792)
Smaragdina constrictifrons Medvedev, 2010
Smaragdina coomani (Pic, 1928)
Smaragdina cornuta (Jacoby, 1895)
Smaragdina costata Tan & Wang, 1981
Smaragdina crassipes (Duvivier, 1891)
Smaragdina cribripennis Tan, 1988
Smaragdina crucipennis (Jacoby, 1908)
Smaragdina daklaka Medvedev, 2010
Smaragdina dalatensis Kimoto & Gressitt, 1979
Smaragdina delesserti (Lacordaire, 1848)
Smaragdina discolor (Solsky, 1882)
Smaragdina diversesignata (Pic, 1946)
Smaragdina diversiceps (Pic, 1941)
Smaragdina diversipes Letzner, 1839
Smaragdina divisa (Jacoby, 1889)
Smaragdina divisomima Medvedev, 2010
Smaragdina djebellina (Lefèvre, 1872)
Smaragdina dohertyi (Jacoby, 1908)
Smaragdina duporti Pic, 1937)
Smaragdina duvivieri (Jacoby, 1908)
Smaragdina emarginata Medvedev, 1995
Smaragdina eroshkinae Medvedev, 1988
Smaragdina fabrei (Lefèvre, 1883)
Smaragdina ferulae (Gené, 1839)
Smaragdina flavicollis Charpentier, 1825
Smaragdina flavicoxis Medvedev, 1992
Smaragdina flavifrons Gressitt & Kimoto, 1961
Smaragdina flavilabris (Breit, 1917)
Smaragdina flaviventris (Jacoby, 1908)
Smaragdina flavobasalis (Jacoby, 1908)
Smaragdina flavovariegata Medvedev, 1999
Smaragdina frontalis (Jacoby, 1908)
Smaragdina fulveola (Jacoby, 1890)
Smaragdina fulvitarsis Medvedev, 1992
Smaragdina furthi Erber & Medvedev, 1999
Smaragdina fuscicornis (Lacordaire, 1848)
Smaragdina fuscitarsis (Jacoby, 1900)
Smaragdina golda Jacobson, 1925
Smaragdina graeca (Kraatz, 1872)
Smaragdina gratiosa (Lucas, 1845)
Smaragdina guillebeaui (Pic, 1927)
Smaragdina hejingensis Duan, Wang & Zhou, 2022
Smaragdina higuchii Kimoto & Takizawa, 1981
Smaragdina himalayana Medvedev, 2010
Smaragdina ihai (Chûjô, 1958)
Smaragdina imitans (Jacoby, 1903)
Smaragdina impressicollis Tan, 1992
Smaragdina insulana Medvedev, 1992
Smaragdina jeanvoinei (Pic, 1932)
Smaragdina jordanica Medvedev, 2002
Smaragdina judaica (Lefèvre, 1872)
Smaragdina kejvali Kantner & Bezděk, 2007
Smaragdina kimotoi Lopatin, 2003
Smaragdina kimshona Medvedev, 1988
Smaragdina kuromon Kimoto, 1984
Smaragdina kurosuji Kimoto, 1984
Smaragdina labilis Weise, 1889
Smaragdina laboissierei (Pic, 1928)
Smaragdina laevicollis (Jacoby, 1890)
Smaragdina laevipennis (Jacoby, 1908)
Smaragdina laosensis Kimoto & Gressitt, 1979
Smaragdina latemedionotata (Pic, 1946)
Smaragdina laticollis (Duvivier, 1892)
Smaragdina levi Lopatin, 2004
Smaragdina limbata (Steven, 1806)
Smaragdina limbifera (Escalera, 1928)
Smaragdina longicornis (Jacoby, 1897)
Smaragdina macilenta (Weise, 1887)
Smaragdina maculicollis (Chûjô, 1952)
Smaragdina magnipunctata Duan, Wang and Zhou, 2022
Smaragdina maharashtra Kantner & Bezděk, 2007
Smaragdina malakkana Medvedev, 2010
Smaragdina mandzhura (Jacobson, 1925)
Smaragdina mangkamensis Tan & Wang, 1981
Smaragdina mapellii Takizawa, 1990
Smaragdina medvedevi Medvedev, 1984
Smaragdina megalayana Medvedev & Kantner, 2002
Smaragdina micheli Medvedev, 1995
Smaragdina militaris (J. L. LeConte, 1858)
Smaragdina minuta (Jacoby, 1908)
Smaragdina minutissima (Lopatin, 1967)
Smaragdina miyakei Kimoto, 1976
Smaragdina miyatakei Kimoto, 1976
Smaragdina montana Medvedev, 1988
Smaragdina motschulskyi Medvedev, 1992
Smaragdina moutoni (Pic, 1897)
Smaragdina murzini Lopatin, 2003
Smaragdina nagaensis (Jacoby, 1908)
Smaragdina nigricollis Medvedev, 2004
Smaragdina nigripennis (Chûjô, 1952)
Smaragdina nigriscutis Medvedev, 1970
Smaragdina nigroguttata Lopatin, 2002
Smaragdina nigropygidialis (Pic, 1946)
Smaragdina nigrosignata Pic, 1954
Smaragdina nigrosternum Erber & Medvedev, 1999
Smaragdina nigrosuturalis (Jacoby, 1908)
Smaragdina nigrotibialis (Jacoby, 1908)
Smaragdina nigroviolacea Lopatin, 2004
Smaragdina nilgiriensis (Jacoby, 1903)
Smaragdina nipponensis (Chûjô, 1951)
Smaragdina nomurai Kimoto, 1976
Smaragdina oblonga Lopatin, 2009
Smaragdina obscuripes Weise, 1887
Smaragdina octomaculata (Chûjô, 1952)
Smaragdina oculata Medvedev, 1988
Smaragdina occidentalis Medvedev, 2010
Smaragdina orientalis (Jacoby, 1908)
Smaragdina ornatipennis Medvedev, 2004
Smaragdina pacholatkoi Medvedev, 2003
Smaragdina pakistanica Medvedev, 2010
Smaragdina pallescens (Pic, 1895)
Smaragdina peplopteroides (Weise, 1889)
Smaragdina persica (Pic, 1911)
Smaragdina piceifrons (Pic, 1941)
Smaragdina planifrons (Jacoby, 1908)
Smaragdina potanini Medvedev, 1970
Smaragdina punctatissima (Weise, 1892)
Smaragdina quadrimaculata Lopatin, 2009
Smaragdina quadratomaculata (Jacoby, 1896)
Smaragdina rapillyi (Lopatin, 2002)
Smaragdina reductelineata (Pic, 1946)
Smaragdina regalini Medvedev & Kantner, 2002
Smaragdina regularis Medvedev, 1985
Smaragdina reyi (Brisout, 1866)
Smaragdina rufimana Lacordaire, 1848
Smaragdina salemensis (Pic, 1946)
Smaragdina salicina (Scopoli, 1763)
Smaragdina sassii Warchałowski, 2012
Smaragdina saudica Medvedev, 1993
Smaragdina scalaris (Pic, 1927)
Smaragdina schereri Lopatin, 2006
Smaragdina scutellaris (Lefèvre, 1872)
Smaragdina semiauranthiaca (Fairmaire, 1888)
Smaragdina semipunctata (Duvivier, 1891)
Smaragdina semiviridis (Pic, 1922)
Smaragdina signaticollis (Redtenbacher, 1848)
Smaragdina sikkimia (Jacoby, 1903)
Smaragdina spenceri Kimoto & Gressitt, 1979
Smaragdina sprecherae Medvedev, 2002
Smaragdina stenroosi (Jacobson, 1901)
Smaragdina striatipennis (Jacoby, 1903)
Smaragdina subacuminata (Pic, 1927)
Smaragdina subdivisa (Jacoby, 1900)
Smaragdina subsignata (Fairmaire, 1888)
Smaragdina symmetria Tan, 1988
Smaragdina szechuana Medvedev, 1995
Smaragdina tamdaoana Medvedev, 2010
Smaragdina tani Lopatin, 2004
Smaragdina taynguensis Medvedev, 1985
Smaragdina terminalis (Lefèvre, 1883)
Smaragdina thailandica Medvedev, 2010
Smaragdina thorasica (Fischer, 1842)
Smaragdina tianmuensis Wang & Zhou, 2013
Smaragdina tibialis (Brullé, 1832)
Smaragdina tonkinensis (Lefèvre, 1891)
Smaragdina trimaculaticeps (Pic, 1946)
Smaragdina tunisea Warchałowski, 2000
Smaragdina unipunctata (Olivier, 1808)
Smaragdina variabilis (Chûjô, 1952)
Smaragdina vaulogeri (Pic, 1894)
Smaragdina vietnamensis Kimoto & Gressitt, 1979
Smaragdina vinula (Weise, 1903)
Smaragdina virgata Lopatin, 2004
Smaragdina viridana (Lacordaire, 1848)
Smaragdina viridis (Kraatz, 1882)
Smaragdina viridipennis (Pic, 1937)
Smaragdina volkovitshi Lopatin, 2004
Smaragdina wallardiensis (Jacoby, 1908)
Smaragdina wittmeri (Medvedev, 1970)
Smaragdina xanthaspis (Germar, 1824)
Smaragdina yajiangensis Wang & Zhou, 2013
Smaragdina yangae Wang & Zhou, 2013
Smaragdina yunnana Medvedev, 1995
Smaragdina zhangi Wang & Zhou, 2013

References 

Biolib
European Chrysomelidae

Beetles of Europe
Chrysomelidae genera
Clytrini
Taxa named by Louis Alexandre Auguste Chevrolat